Latin Fever is an album by American jazz flautist Herbie Mann recorded for the Atlantic label and released in 1964. The album features tracks from the 1962 sessions that produced Do the Bossa Nova with Herbie Mann with more recent recordings.

Reception

AllMusic awarded the album 3 stars.

Track listing
 "Harlem Nocturne" (Earle Hagen, Dick Rogers) – 2:15
 "Fever" (Eddie Cooley, John Davenport) – 1:52
 "Not Now – Later On" (Garry Sherman, Norman Meade) – 1:51
 "The Golden Striker" (John Lewis) – 2:14
 "How Insensitive" (Antônio Carlos Jobim) – 3:04
 "You Came a Long Way from St. Louis" (John Benson Brooks, Bob Russell) – 2:28
 "Batida Differente" (Maurício Einhorn, Durval Lelys) – 5:12
 "Nana" (Baden Powell) – 3:59
 "Groovy Samba" (Sérgio Mendes) – 5:06
 "Influenza de Jazz" (Carlos Lyra) – 5:38 
Recorded in Rio de Janeiro, Brazil on October 15, 1962 (track 8), October 16, 1962 (tracks 7 & 10), October 17, 1962 (track 5) & October 19, 1962 (track 9) and in New York City on October 8, 1963 (tracks 1–3 & 6) and January 29, 1964 (track 4)

Personnel 
Herbie Mann – flute
Durval Ferreira (tracks 7 & 10), Baden Powell (track 8), Bill Suyker (tracks 1–3 & 6) – guitar 
Clark Terry (tracks 1–3 & 6), Pedro Paulo (tracks 7 & 10), Ernie Royal (tracks 1–3 & 6) – trumpet 
Paulo Moura – alto saxophone (tracks 7 & 10)
Antônio Carlos Jobim – piano, vocals, arranger (tracks 5 & 9)
Sérgio Mendes – piano (tracks 7 & 10)
Paul Griffin – piano, organ (tracks 1–3 & 6)
Gabriel (track 8), Otavio Bailly Jr. (tracks 7 & 10) – bass
Juquinha (track 8), Dom Um Romão (tracks 7 & 10), Bobby Thomas (tracks 1–3 & 6) – drums
George Devens – vibraphone, percussion (tracks 1–3 & 6)
Other unidentified musicians

References 

1964 albums
Herbie Mann albums
Albums produced by Nesuhi Ertegun
Atlantic Records albums